Francisco Castro may refer to:

Francisco Castro (footballer, born 1910), Portuguese footballer
Francisco Castro (footballer, born 1979), Portuguese footballer
Francisco Castro (footballer, born 1990), Chilean footballer
Francisco Castro Ada (1934–2010), Northern Mariana Islands politician
Francisco Castro Lalupú (born 1973), Peruvian Roman Catholic prelate
Francisco Castro Trenti, Mexican politician
Francisco Castro (jumper) (1922–2008), Puerto Rican long and triple jumper
Francisco Castro (hurdler), Chilean hurdler and high jumper at the 2008 Ibero-American Championships in Athletics – Results
Francisco María Castro (1770–1831), American landowner and rancher in California